Moods is the eighth studio album by Neil Diamond, released by Uni Records in 1972. It contained the second of his #1 songs, "Song Sung Blue", and was something of a follow-up in style to the highly experimental Tap Root Manuscript.

Billboard praised Moods highly, saying it contained "brilliant, diversified material." This album, and its follow-up live album Hot August Night, are generally acknowledged to be the two most important recording projects of Diamond's career in terms of defining his signature sound for the future. Within the music industry and among music professionals this is considered one of Diamond's better and more creative recordings. It received a Grammy Award nomination for Album of the Year for 1972. Song Sung Blue was nominated for Grammy Awards for Record of the Year and Song of the Year. Lee Holdridge was the arranger and conductor of the orchestra.

According to Cash Box, the third single from the album, "Walk on Water," sounds a little like Cat Stevens.

Track listing
All tracks written by Neil Diamond.

Charts

Year-end charts

References

Neil Diamond albums
1972 albums
MCA Records albums
Albums conducted by Lee Holdridge
Albums arranged by Lee Holdridge
Albums produced by Tom Catalano
Uni Records albums
Grammy Award for Best Engineered Album, Non-Classical